This is a list of the Honduras national football team results from 1960 to 1979.

1960
In 1960, Honduras participated for the first time in a FIFA World Cup qualification.  On October, FIFA awarded Honduras a 0–2 win against Guatemala after they forfeited, making this the third time in the last decade in which a match is scheduled between these two but not played.

1961

1963
On 7 April, Honduras faced Costa Rica in the 1963 CONCACAF Championship, becoming at the same time, the contenders for the Unofficial Football World Championships; however, they fail to conquer the title by losing 1–2 in San Salvador.

1965

1967

1968

1969
In 1969, Honduras faced El Salvador in the semifinal round of the 1970 FIFA World Cup qualification in a period in which both nations were fighting a war over land reforms and immigration and demographic problems; the qualifying matches added more tension to a conflict that later came to be known as the Football War.

1970

1971
In 1971, after eliminating Guatemala in the qualifying phase of the 1971 CONCACAF Championship, Honduras had to face El Salvador in a home-away double header.  However, due to the still fresh 1969 Football War the Cuscatlecos withdrew from the tournament, giving Honduras an automatic bye.

1972

1973

1975

1977
In 1977, Honduras faced a European nation for the first time when they draw 0–0 in a friendly match against Hungary.

1978

Record
Record does not include matches against domestic clubs.

References

1960s